Sway is the second studio album by American alternative rock band Whirr, released on September 23, 2014 by Graveface Records. The album marked the departure of previous lead singer Alexandra Morte, as well as the first release with Devin Nunes who replaced Sergio Miranda on drums. It was produced by Jack Shirley.

Release and reception

On July 11, 2014, the band released the song "Mumble" on SoundCloud as a preview of the new album.

At Metacritic, which assigns a normalized rating out of 100 to reviews from mainstream critics, Sway received an average score of 74, based on six reviews, which indicates "generally favorable reviews". Tim Sendra of AllMusic noted that Sway'''s sound had taken a large influence from Nick Bassett's presence, "inch[ing] them closer to the harder side of the shoegaze revival (right next to Bassett's other band, Nothing, in fact)". He gave the album 4 out of 5 stars and finalized his review by saying that "Sway'' is an album that would measure up to almost any album made by the first wave of shoegazers". Punknews.org gave the album 3.5 out of 5 stars; while generally praising the album, the reviewer wished that Whirr would "experiment even more and toy with new music to give a bit more insight as to where the road leads", and also noted that "some tracks are a tad too long and sometimes, it drags".

Track listing

Personnel
Whirr
Nick Bassett – guitar
Joseph Bautista – guitar
Devin Nunes – drums, percussion
Loren Riviera – lead vocals, guitar
Eddie Salgado – bass guitar

Other personnel
Jack Shirley – production

References

Whirr (band) albums
2014 albums
Shoegaze albums by American artists
Albums produced by Jack Shirley